Dominique Braye (born 21 October 1947 in Lyon) was a member of the Senate of France, representing the Yvelines department from 1995 to 2011. He is a member of the Union for a Popular Movement.

References
Page on the Senate website 

1947 births
Living people
Union for a Popular Movement politicians
French Senators of the Fifth Republic
Senators of Yvelines
Politicians from Lyon